These are full results of The Match Europe v USA, a track and field competition which took place in Minsk, Belarus, on 9 and 10 September 2019 at the Dinamo Stadium. There were 37 events in total, 18 for men, 18 for women, and a mixed relay.

Men

100 meters
9 SeptemberWind: -1.1 m/s

200 meters
10 SeptemberWind: 0.0 m/s

400 meters
9 September

800 meters
10 September

1500 meters
9 September

3000 meters
10 September

110 meters hurdles
10 SeptemberWind: +0.1 m/s

400 meters hurdles
10 September

3000 meters steeplechase
9 September

4 × 100 meters relay
9 September

High jump
9 September

Pole vault
10 September

Long jump
9 September

Triple jump
10 September

Shot put
9 September

Discus throw
10 September

Hammer throw
9 September

Javelin throw
10 September

Women

100 meters
9 SeptemberWind: -0.8 m/s

200 meters
10 SeptemberWind: -0.1 m/s

400 meters
9 September

800 meters
9 September

1500 meters
10 September

3000 meters
9 September

100 meters hurdles
10 SeptemberWind: +0.1 m/s

400 meters hurdles
10 September

3000 meters steeplechase
9 September

4 × 100 meters relay
9 September

High jump
10 September

Pole vault
9 September

Long jump
10 September

Triple jump
9 September

Shot put
10 September

Discus throw
9 September

Hammer throw
10 September

Javelin throw
9 September

Mixed

Medley relay 200+200+400+800
10 September

References

2019 in athletics (track and field)